Villers-Bocage is a commune in the Calvados department in the Normandy region in Northern France.

History

Second World War
The Battle of Villers-Bocage was a significant battle between British and German forces on 13 June 1944 during the Battle of Normandy. 
Further fighting occurred two weeks later during Operation Epsom, during which the village was destroyed by 250 RAF heavy bombers.

Population

International relations
The commune is twinned with:
 Bampton, Devon, UK since 1974

See also
Communes of the Calvados department

References

External links

Website of the office of tourism (in French)
Information about Villers-Bocage

Communes of Calvados (department)
Calvados communes articles needing translation from French Wikipedia